Abies nebrodensis, the Sicilian fir, is a fir native to the Madonie mountains in northern Sicily.

Taxonomy
It is closely related to silver fir, Abies alba, which replaces it in the Apennine Mountains of Italy and elsewhere further north in Europe; some botanists treat Sicilian fir as a variety of silver fir, as Abies alba var. nebrodensis.

Description
It is a medium-size evergreen coniferous tree growing to 15–25 m tall and with a trunk diameter of up to 1 m.

The leaves are needle-like, flattened, 1.5–2.5 cm long and 2 mm wide by 0.5 mm thick, glossy dark green above, and with two greenish-white bands of stomata below. The tip of the leaf is blunt with a notched tip, but sometimes with a pointed tip, particularly on shoots high on older trees. The cones are 10–16 cm long and 4 cm broad, with about 150 scales, each scale with an exserted bract and two winged seeds; they disintegrate when mature to release the seeds.

Distribution

Ecology
It occurs at altitudes of 1400–1,600 metres. It is limited to the steep, dry slopes.

Conservation
As a result of deforestation, it is now extremely rare, with only 25 mature trees surviving; replanting programmes are meeting with limited success due to heavy grazing pressure by livestock belonging to local farmers. It has been classified as 'critically endangered' in the IUCN Red List in 2017. In the European Union it has been designated as a 'priority species' under Annex II of the Habitats Directive, which means areas in which it occurs can be declared Special Areas of Conservation, if these areas belong to one of the number of habitats listed in Annex I of the directive.

References

nebrodensis
Endemic flora of Sicily
Trees of Europe
Critically endangered plants
Critically endangered biota of Europe